Sophia Sergio (born 16 February 1992) is an Italian beauty pageant titleholder who was crowned Miss Universo Italia 2016 and represented Italy in Miss Universe 2016 in Manila, Philippines.

Early life
Sergio is a graduate of the three-year degree course in International Business Management and of the specialist degree in Marketing and International Management at the Parthenope University of Naples. She has two younger brothers and as a teenager he discovered a passion for basketball and judo, while the approach to the world of fashion took place at the age of 15 when he accidentally accompanied a friend to a fashion show.

Miss Italia 2011
Sergio began her pageantry career representing Miss Cinema Veribel Campania in the Miss Italia 2011 competition on September 19, 2011, but did not place.

Miss Universo Italia 2016
Sergio was crowned Miss Universo Italia 2016 held on December 18, 2016 at the Parco dei Principi Grand Hotel in Rome by her predecessor Giada Pezzaioli.

Miss Universe 2016
As the official representative of her country to the 2016 Miss Universe pageant held in Manila, Philippines on 30 January 2017, but did not place.

References

External links 
Sito ufficiale di Miss Universo Italia

1992 births
Living people
Miss Universe 2016 contestants
Italian beauty pageant winners
Models from Naples